Mulberry Township may refer to:

 Mulberry Township, Crawford County, Arkansas, in Crawford County, Arkansas
 Mulberry Township, Franklin County, Arkansas, in Franklin County, Arkansas
 Mulberry Township, Johnson County, Arkansas, in Johnson County, Arkansas
 Mulberry Township, Clay County, Kansas
 Mulberry Township, Ellsworth County, Kansas
 Mulberry Township, Caldwell County, North Carolina, in Caldwell County, North Carolina
 Mulberry Township, Wilkes County, North Carolina, in Wilkes County, North Carolina

Township name disambiguation pages